The Girl Friend is a musical comedy with music by Richard Rodgers, lyrics by Lorenz Hart and book by Herbert Fields. This was the longest running show for the trio to that date.

Production
The Girl Friend opened on Broadway at the Vanderbilt Theatre on March 17, 1926 and closed on December 27, 1926 after 301 performances. Produced by Lew Fields (Herbert's father), staged by John Harwood with musical staging by Jack Haskell, the cast starred Sammy White, Eva Puck and June Cochrane. White and Puck were married and well-known vaudeville performers of the time.

Plot
A cyclist trains on a wheel connected to a butter churn on his dairy farm.  He is in love with the daughter of a professional cyclist. He is urged to enter a six-day race by questionable cycling promoter. Various gamblers try to cause him to lose, but he wins the race and the girl.

Songs
Act 1
 "Hey! Hey!"
 "The Simple Life"
 "The Girl Friend"
 "Goodbye, Lenny"
 "Blue Room"
 "Cabarets"
 "Why Do I?"
 "The Damsel Who Done All the Dirt"
 "He's a Winner"
 "Town Hall Tonight"
 "Good Fellow, Mine"

Act 2
 "Creole Cooning Song"
 "I'd Like to Take You Home"
 "What Is It?"

Critical response
Reviewers praised the humor, dancing, and the "captivating music."  The New York American reviewer wrote: "This WAS music, instead of molasses.  There was a ditty called 'The Blue Room' which should be sung to exhaustion".

References

External links 
 Internet Broadway Database listing
 Overview of show, lorenzhart.org
 Ovrtur Page for The Girl Friend

1926 musicals
Broadway musicals
Musicals by Rodgers and Hart
Musicals set in the Roaring Twenties
Musicals by Herbert Fields